The "Saving Iran's Great Uprising"  (acronymed NEQAB) more commonly known as the Nojeh coup d'état, was a plan to overthrow the newly established Islamic Republic of Iran and its government of Abolhassan Banisadr and Ruhollah Khomeini.

Plan 
The plan involved officers and servicemen from the infantry, air force, army and secret service, and was largely halted by the arrest of hundreds of officers on 9–10 July 1980 at Nojeh Air Base, near Hamedan, although substantial sabotage damage had already been carried out, with only 28 tanks (of 159) operational in the frontline Khuzestan Province. The plan was organised by Colonel Muhammad Baqir Bani-Amiri, a retired Gendermerie officer, with the Shah's last Prime Minister, Shapour Bakhtiar, contributing financial support and providing his contacts and authority. Bakhtiar's liaison with the conspirators in Iran was the businessman Manucher Ghorbanifar, who headed the logistics branch of the Niqab network which organised the civilian part of the plot. Bakhtiar told the plotters the United States "had given [the coup] its blessing," but "he was lying" as the U.S. "knew nothing about the Nojeh operation and would likely have opposed it on the grounds that it would endanger the lives of the [American] hostages" still held in Iran.

Failed coup
According to then-President Abolhassan Banisadr, the government discovered eight major cells, and exposed the plotters' plan, leading to the arrests: "their plan was to give the appearance of a coup d'etat to restore the Shah, while the real aim was to provide a pretext to cover the Iraqi invasion. According to the information we received, the conspirators had set up a military camp in [the Iraqi city of] Sulimanieh and planned to ignite a Kurdish revolt and organize demonstrations throughout Iran. Their strategy was simple: internal disorders would first disperse Iranian military forces, so that on the very first day of the Iraqi attack Saddam could occupy the whole Western part of the country."
After the failure of the coup, Khomeini delivered a speech in Jamaran Huseinieh and said, "they want to plot, and this type of plot. Even if we were not to neutralize it, people would suffocate it. … Suppose their phantoms were able to take off, what then they could do. The nation is not asleep that a phantom or two could do anything."

After coup
Khomeini ordered those arrested for involvement in the coup to be executed, but Banisadr used legal ruses to delay the executions, and when Iraq invaded, most were freed on the promise of a return to active duty. 144 participants were however executed, and in the following months 2,000–4,000 military personnel dismissed. An assassination attempt was made on Shapour Bakhtiar in Paris on 18 July, and on 22 July Ali Akbar Tabatabaei, the former Iranian press attache in the US, was assassinated in Bethesda, Maryland.

References

Conflicts in 1980
1980 in Iran
History of the Islamic Republic of Iran
Iran
Iran–Iraq relations
Aftermath of the Iranian Revolution
Coup d'état attempts in Asia
Military coups in Iran
Islamic Republic of Iran Army
Militant opposition to the Islamic Republic of Iran
July 1980 events in Asia